State Highway 78 (SH 78) is a state highway connecting Pueblo to the town of Beulah and the San Isabel National Forest. The western terminus is at SH 165 at Greenhill Divide in the San Isabel National Forest. and the eastern terminus is at SH 45 in Pueblo.

Route description

SH 78 runs , starting at a junction with SH 165 at Greenhill Divide in the San Isabel National Forest, and ending at a junction with SH 45 in Pueblo. A short spur route, marked as SH 78 Bus. runs  from the main highway in Beulah Valley, and ending at the intersection of Grand and Pennsylvania avenues in Beulah.

Major intersections

Related route 

SH 78 Bus.'s eastern terminus is at SH 78 in Beulah Valley, and the western terminus is at County Route 225 (CR 225) in Beulah. SH 78 Bus. mainly serves as a connector route between Beulah and the main SH 78

References

External links

078
Transportation in Custer County, Colorado
Transportation in Pueblo County, Colorado
Pueblo, Colorado